Landon Fox is an American football coach who is the head coach at Valparaiso University. Fox previously spent 11 seasons as an assistant at Dayton, serving in the role of defensive coordinator. Fox was named the head coach at Valparaiso on March 5, 2019, after previous head coach Dave Cecchini departed for Bucknell.

Head coaching record

References

External links
 Valparaiso profile
 Dayton profile

Year of birth missing (living people)
Living people
Ball State Cardinals football coaches
Dayton Flyers football coaches
Defiance Yellow Jackets football players
Lakeland Muskies football coaches
Valparaiso Beacons football coaches
Wayne State Warriors football coaches
High school football coaches in Ohio